From This Pen is a compilation album by American country music singer-songwriter Bill Anderson. It was released in June 1965 via Decca Records in several sessions produced by Owen Bradley. It was Anderson's second compilation released during his career and contained songs that he had recorded since his signing with the label. Many of the songs featured were major hits for Anderson in preceding years.

Background, release and reception

From This Pen was Anderson's first compilation (and album overall) to feature entirely self-composed material. The album's title was derived from this idea. Although many of these songs were recorded by other artists, Anderson also cut them. This occurred in a series of sessions that took place in his early years at Decca (between 1958 and 1965). All of the sessions were produced by Anderson's long-time studio producer, Owen Bradley. The recording sessions were held at both the Bradley Studio and the Columbia Studio in Nashville, Tennessee. The album contained a total of 13 tracks. This included the lead track, which served as a spoken introduction to the album. Only two tracks were co-written with other songwriters. The remaining tracks were entirely self-composed. Several of these compositions were pitched to other country artists and became major hits during this time. These former hits include Connie Smith's "Once a Day," Lefty Frizzell's "Saginaw, Michigan," Ray Price's "City Lights" and Charlie Louvin's "I Don't Love You Anymore."

From This Pen was released in June 1965 on the Decca label. It was Anderson's second compilation released in his music career. The record was issued as a vinyl LP, containing seven track on side one and six tracks on side two. From This Pen spent 14 weeks on the Billboard Top Country Albums chart and peaked at number seven in October 1965. It became Anderson's third album to chart on the Billboard country albums survey. From This Pen received positive reception from Allmusic, who rated the record three out of five stars.

Track listing
All songs composed by Bill Anderson, except where noted.

Personnel
All credits are adapted from the liner notes of From This Pen.

Musical personnel
 Bill Anderson – lead vocals
 Harold Bradley – banjo, guitar
 Floyd Cramer – piano, vibes
 Jimmy Day – steel guitar
 Pete Drake – steel guitar
 Buddy Emmons – steel guitar
 Buddy Harman – drums
 Tommy Jackson – fiddle
 Bob Moore – bass
 Morris Palmer – drums
 Jimmy Riddle – harmonica
 The Anita Kerr Singers – background vocals
 Joe Zinkan – bass

Technical personnel
 Owen Bradley – producer

Chart performance

Release history

References

1965 albums
Albums produced by Owen Bradley
Bill Anderson (singer) compilation albums
Decca Records albums